Saint-Eloy is a commune in the Finistère department of Brittany in north-western France.

History 
In 1521, the monks of the Abbey of Daoulas, fleeing the plague, took refuge in Fresq (former name of the town) and build a chapel there, which stood today as the church of Saint-Eloy. The name Saint-Eloy came from Saint Eligius.

Sights
Arboretum du Cranou

See also
Communes of the Finistère department
Parc naturel régional d'Armorique

References

External links

Official website 
Mayors of Finistère Association 

Communes of Finistère